Common Ordinary Equity (CEQ) in financial markets represents the common shareholders' interest in the company. CEQ is a component of Shareholders' Equity Total (SEQ).

CEQ is the sum of:
 Common/Ordinary Stock (Capital) (CSTK)
 Capital Surplus/Share Premium Reserve (CAPS)
 Retained Earnings (RE)

less:
 Treasury Stock Total (All Capital) (TSTK)

CEQ includes:
 Common stock outstanding, including treasury stock adjustments
 Capital surplus
 Retained earnings
 Treasury stock adjustments for both common and nonredeemable preferred stock

See also
 Equity (finance)
 History of private equity and venture capital
 Private investment in public equity
 Publicly traded private equity

References

Stock market
Equity securities
Corporate finance
Shareholders